Passy-Kéli is a village in the commune of Kani-Kéli on Mayotte.

Populated places in Mayotte